is a Japanese footballer who plays for Iwate Grulla Morioka.

Career
Younger brother of Ryo, Tsuyoshi Miyaichi was signed by Shonan Bellmare in 2014. After almost two years squad, he was firstly loaned to Mito Hollyhock during 2015. For 2016 he has been sent on loan to J3 team Gainare Tottori.

Club statistics
Updated to 23 February 2019.

References

External links
Profile at Grulla Morioka

Profile at Gainare Tottori

1995 births
Living people
Association football people from Aichi Prefecture
Japanese footballers
J2 League players
J3 League players
Shonan Bellmare players
Mito HollyHock players
Gainare Tottori players
J.League U-22 Selection players
MIO Biwako Shiga players
Iwate Grulla Morioka players
Association football forwards